James Timilty may refer to:

 James E. Timilty (fl. 2005–17), Massachusetts state senator
 James P. Timilty (1865–1921), Massachusetts state senator